1 Corinthians 7 is the seventh chapter of the First Epistle to the Corinthians in the New Testament of the Christian Bible. It is authored by Paul the Apostle and Sosthenes in Ephesus. In this chapter, Paul replies to certain questions raised by the Corinthian church in a letter sent to him.

Text
The original text was written in Koine Greek. This chapter is divided into 40 verses.

Textual witnesses
Some early manuscripts containing the text of this chapter are:
Papyrus 129 (mid 2nd century; extant verses 32–37)
Papyrus 15 (3rd century; extant verses 18–40)
Codex Vaticanus (325–350)
Codex Sinaiticus (330–360)
Codex Alexandrinus (400–440)
Codex Ephraemi Rescriptus (~450; extant verses 1–17)
Papyrus 11 (7th century; extant verses 3–6, 10–11,12–14)

Letter from Corinth
In this chapter, Paul replies to certain questions raised by the Corinthian church in a letter to him. Methodist writer Joseph Benson comments:

Principles of marriage (7:1–16)

Verse 6

 "But I say this by permission": referring to 1 Corinthians 7:5 about husband and wife separating for a time  for fasting and prayer  and afterwards coming together again, because it is not God's command that they should separate for a time. It does not refer to Paul's earlier statement in 1 Corinthians 7:2 that to avoid "sexual immorality, let each man have his own wife, and let each woman have her own husband," as this is by command  (Genesis 2:24), not by permission, that carnal copulation should be between one man and one woman in a married state. Nor it is related to 1 Corinthians 7:3–4 that married persons render to the affection to each other, and have authority over each other's bodies, as it is a precept, not a permission (Exodus 21:10).
 "Not as a commandment": Paul said this as an advice, "lest Satan should draw them into sin", but without fixed time, and to be said in opposition to a Jewish notion, which makes marriage a "command", as Paul puts it as a matter of choice, and not of obligation.

Verse 11

"Depart": If the sin of separation has been committed, a new marriage is not to be added (Matthew 5:32).

Living as one's calling (7:17–40)

Verse 17

"Ordain": or "direct"

See also
Divorce
Marriage
Negiah
Related Bible parts: Genesis 2, Exodus 19, 1 Samuel 21, Jeremiah 15, Matthew 19, Mark 10

References

External links 
 King James Bible - Wikisource
English Translation with Parallel Latin Vulgate
Online Bible at GospelHall.org (ESV, KJV, Darby, American Standard Version, Bible in Basic English)
Multiple bible versions at Bible Gateway (NKJV, NIV, NRSV etc.)

 
07